In evolutionary ecology, an ecotype, sometimes called ecospecies, describes a genetically distinct geographic variety, population, or race within a species, which is genotypically adapted to specific environmental conditions.

Typically, though ecotypes exhibit phenotypic differences (such as in morphology or physiology) stemming from environmental heterogeneity, they are capable of interbreeding with other geographically adjacent ecotypes without loss of fertility or vigor.

Definition
An ecotype is a variant in which the phenotypic differences are too few or too subtle to warrant being classified as a subspecies. These different variants can occur in the same geographic region where distinct habitats such as meadow, forest, swamp, and sand dunes provide ecological niches. Where similar ecological conditions occur in widely separated places, it is possible for a similar ecotype to occur in the separated locations. An ecotype is different than a subspecies, which may exist across a number of different habitats. In animals, ecotypes owe their differing characteristics to the effects of a very local environment. Therefore, ecotypes have no taxonomic rank.

Terminology

Ecotypes are closely related to morphs. In the context of evolutionary biology, genetic polymorphism is the occurrence in the equilibrium of two or more distinctly different phenotypes within a population of a species, in other words, the occurrence of more than one form or morph. The frequency of these discontinuous forms (even that of the rarest) is too high to be explained by mutation. In order to be classified as such, morphs must occupy the same habitat at the same time and belong to a panmictic population (whose members can all potentially interbreed). Polymorphism is actively and steadily maintained in populations of species by natural selection (most famously sexual dimorphism in humans) in contrast to transient polymorphisms where conditions in a habitat change in such a way that a "form" is being replaced completely by another.

In fact, Begon, Townsend, and Harper assert that

The notions "form" and "ecotype" may appear to correspond to a static phenomenon, however; this is not always the case. Evolution occurs continuously both in time and space, so that two ecotypes or forms may qualify as distinct species in only a few generations. Begon, Townsend, and Harper use an illuminating analogy on this:

Thus ecotypes and morphs can be thought of as precursory steps of potential speciation.

Range and distribution

Experiments indicate that sometimes ecotypes manifest only when separated by great spatial distances (of the order of 1,000 km). This is due to hybridization whereby different but adjacent varieties of the same species (or generally of the same taxonomic rank) interbreed, thus overcoming local selection. However other studies reveal that the opposite may happen, i.e., ecotypes revealing at very small scales (of the order of 10 m), within populations, and despite hybridization.

In ecotypes, it is common for continuous, gradual geographic variation to impose analogous phenotypic and genetic variation. This situation is called cline. A well-known example of a cline is the skin color gradation in indigenous human populations worldwide, which is related to latitude and amounts of sunlight. But often the distribution of ecotypes is bimodal or multimodal. This means that ecotypes may display two or more distinct and discontinuous phenotypes even within the same population. Such phenomenon may lead to speciation and can occur if conditions in a local environment change dramatically through space or time.

Examples

 Tundra reindeer and woodland reindeer are two ecotypes of reindeer. The first migrate (travelling 5,000 km) annually between the two environments in large numbers whereas the other (who are much fewer) remain in the forest for the summer. In North America, the species Rangifer tarandus (locally known as caribou), was subdivided into five subspecies by Banfield in 1961. Caribou are classified by ecotype depending on several behavioural factors – predominant habitat use (northern, tundra, mountain, forest, boreal forest, forest-dwelling), spacing (dispersed or aggregated) and migration (sedentary or migratory). For example, the subspecies Rangifer tarandus caribou is further distinguished by a number of ecotypes, including boreal woodland caribou, mountain woodland caribou, and migratory woodland caribou (such as the migratory George River Caribou Herd in the Ungava region of Quebec).
 Arabis fecunda, a herb endemic to some calcareous soils of Montana, United States, can be divided into two ecotypes. The one "low elevation" group lives near the ground in an arid, warm environment and has thus developed a significantly greater tolerance against drought than the "high elevation" group. The two ecotypes are separated by a horizontal distance of about 100 km.
 It is commonly accepted that the Tucuxi dolphin has two ecotypes – the riverine ecotype found in some South American rivers and the pelagic ecotype found in the South Atlantic Ocean. Similarly, it is accepted that the common bottlenose dolphin has two ecotypes in the western North Atlantic.
 The warbler finch and the Cocos Island finch are viewed as separate ecotypes.
 The Scots pine (Pinus sylvestris) has 20 different ecotypes in an area from Scotland to Siberia, all capable of interbreeding.
 Ecotype distinctions can be subtle and do not always require large distances; it has been observed that two populations of the same Helix snail species separated by only a few hundred kilometers prefer not to cross-mate, i.e., they reject one another as mates. This event probably occurs during the process of courtship, which may last for hours.

See also

Adaptation
Biological classification
Cline (biology)
Ecotope
Epigenetics
Evolution
Polymorphism (biology)
Ring species
Speciation
Species problem
Terroir

Explanatory notes

References

Landscape ecology
Botany
Zoology
Ecology